Mahakali, formerly Dodhara-Chandani, is a municipality in the Kanchanpur District of Sudurpashchim Province, in Nepal.

Geography 
It is located in the Kanchanpur District of Sudurpashchim Province.

Governance 
The municipality was formed by merging the villages of Dodhara and Chandani, on 18 May 2014.

In 2017, the municipality was renamed to Mahakali after the eponymous Mahakali River.

Population
At the time of the 2011 Nepal census, the population was 39,253 people living in 7,392 households. Many Dodhara and Chandani people migrated from Hill Region. Most people migrated from Dadeldhura, Baitadi, Bajhang, Bajura, Doti etc. districts.

Education
The Bhanu  Multiple Campus is the only Bachelor-level campus. Many government schools are present.bhanu secondary school  The Laxmi  Secondary, Sarda Saraswoti  Secondary School are present. Many primary and secondary schools are affiliated with the Government of Nepal. The municipality has private schools such as Shree Nobel Academy Secondary School, Dhurba Tara Secondary School, Sun Shine Secondary School and Himalayan Academy English Medium School.

Infrastructure
The Mahakali municipality is home to Dodhara Chandani Bridge, which spans the river. The bridge is about 1496.5 meters long, connecting Dodhara and Chandani.

The new 4 lane Bridge that connects to mainland is under construction and 90% work finished

Telecommunications
Ncell and Nepal Telecom (NTC) are the main telecommunication services. Both Ncell and NTC provide 3G service, while NTC offers broadband connections. New internet providers like Subisu, Tech mide are currently providing Hi-Speed Fibre Connection

Health
Main health post Mahakali Municipality Health Post operates in the central area. Two Sub-Health Posts are present. Ward clinics were under  construction at every ward in this municipality. Private clinics and community based nurseries operate in this area.

See also
 Dodhara
 Chandani

References

External links
 District Development Committee, Kanchanpur

Populated places in Kanchanpur District
Nepal municipalities established in 2014
Municipalities in Kanchanpur District